Fern Ridge High School is a public alternative high school in St. Louis County, Missouri that is part of the Parkway School District.

References 

Alternative schools in the United States
Educational institutions established in 1992
High schools in St. Louis County, Missouri
Public high schools in Missouri
1992 establishments in Missouri